Shabonee (YTB-833), sometimes spelled Shabonne, was a United States Navy  named for Pottawatomie Chief Shabonna, grand nephew of Chief Pontiac. Shabonee was the second US Navy ship to bear the name.

Construction

The contract for Shabonee was awarded 5 June 1973. She was laid down on 12 June 1974 at Marinette, Wisconsin, by Marinette Marine and launched 29 October 1974.

Operational history
Shabonee served at Naval Station Mayport, Florida.  Stricken from the Navy List 16 February 2002, ex-Shabonee was sold to McAllister Towing and renamed Daniel McAllister. Blew an engine icebreaking in the Port of Duluth. Scrapped in the summer of 2019.

References

External links
 

 

Natick-class large harbor tugs
Ships built by Marinette Marine
1974 ships